Pseudosterrha paulula is a moth of the family Geometridae first described by Charles Swinhoe in 1886.

Distribution
It known from Algeria, Chad, Egypt, India, Iran, Kenya, Saudi Arabia, Senegal, Somalia, Sudan, Tanzania and the United Arab Emirates.

References

Sterrhinae